Daniil Nikolayevich Savichev (born 12 June 1994) is a former Russian football midfielder.

Club career
He made his debut in the Russian Football National League for FC Torpedo Moscow on 7 October 2013 in a game against FC Arsenal Tula.

Personal life
He is a son of Nikolai Savichev.

References

External links
 
 
 Career summary by sportbox.ru

1994 births
Footballers from Moscow
Living people
Russian footballers
Association football midfielders
FC Torpedo Moscow players
FC Saturn Ramenskoye players